This was the first edition of the tournament.

Oscar Otte won the title after defeating Daniel Masur 7–5, 7–5 in the final.

Seeds

Draw

Finals

Top half

Bottom half

References

External links
Main draw
Qualifying draw

Open Città di Bari - 1